The 2015 Maldon District Council election took place on 7 May to elect all members of Maldon District Council in Essex, England, the same day as the other 2015 United Kingdom local elections and held simultaneously at the same polling places or via the optional combined return of two postal vote envelopes with the 2015 United Kingdom General Election.

Result
The Althorne and Southminster two-seat wards returned one other affiliated member each, the latter being a hold by an independent councillor and the former a gain by a member of UKIP (from a Conservative) both thus to co-represent the area in council meetings alongside a Conservative member. A Conservative gain of an independent affiliated seat in the district, one of those for Burnham on Crouch North completed the election in which 24 seats of 26 are held by members of the same governing party.

NB: The British National Party candidates stood under the description "Fighting Unsustainable Housing because we care" but were promoted as BNP candidates.

Ward results

Althorne

Burnham-on-Crouch South

Burnham-on-Crouch North

Great Totham

Heybridge East

Heybridge West -

Maldon East

Maldon North

Maldon South

Maldon West

Mayland

Purleigh

Southminster

Tillingham

Tolleshunt D'Arcy

Wickham Bishops & Woodham

References

2015 English local elections
May 2015 events in the United Kingdom
2015
2010s in Essex